Proflex Volleyball Club is a female professional volleyball team based in Bangkok, Thailand. The club was founded in 2019 after Air Force Women's Volleyball Club transferred the right to compete and plays in the Thailand league.

Honours

Domestic competitions

Youth League 

 Academy League
  Third (1): 2019

Former names 

 Proflex (2019–present)

Team colors 
Thailand League

    (2019–present)

League results

Team roster 2019–20

Position Main 

 The following is the Proflex VC roster in the : Thailand League 2019-20

2019–20 Results and fixtures

Thailand League

First leg

second leg

Team Captain 

  Thanyarat Srichainat (2019–present)

Head coach

Notable players 

Domestic Players

 Kullporn Kaewrodwai
 Napak Vachalapitikanangkul
 Kultida Hamontree

References 

Volleyball clubs in Thailand
Women's volleyball teams
Volleyball clubs established in 2019
2019 establishments in Thailand